The Sherubainura is a river in the Karaganda Region, Kazakhstan.

The river is the main tributary of the Nura. It freezes between November and April. The main settlements near its banks are Rostovka, Kyzylzhar, and Tegiszhol.

Course 
The Sherubainura has its sources near the western slopes of the Kyzyltas range of the central Kazakh Uplands. It heads roughly northwestwards among mountains all along its course. Its main tributaries are the Karamys, Taldy, Tumatai, Kyzylkoi, Topar and Sokyr. There are three dams in the river, the Zhartas, the Krasnopolyanskoye and the Sherubaynura Dam. Finally, the Sherubainura reaches the Nura and enters it from the left bank near Zhanatalap (formerly Molodetskoye).

The deepest parts reach . The river is fed by rainfall and groundwater.

Fauna
The main fish species in the Sherubainura include roach, ide, Prussian carp, pike and tench. There are also crayfish in some stretches.

See also
List of rivers of Kazakhstan

References

External links

Kuldeeva E. M. On the artificial replenishment of groundwater reserves in the Sherubai-Nur valley in Central Kazakhstan
Реки Казахстана

Rivers of Kazakhstan
Karaganda Region
Tengiz basin